The Bréguet 890 Mercure was a late 1940s French cargo and passenger transport aircraft designed by Bréguet Aviation. Three variants were produced including a military variant called the Mars but none entered production.

Design and development
With a French Air Force requirement to replace the Douglas C-47 and Amiot AAC-1 Bréguet started development of the Breguet 890 as a medium-capacity military transport. The commercial transport prototype designated the Bréguet 890H Mercure was an all-metal cantilever high-wing monoplane powered by two  Bristol Hercules radial engines. It had a retractable tricycle landing gear and, advanced for its day, a swing tail to allow access (using a loading ramp) into the fuselage for heavy equipment and vehicles. A military prototype was also built under the designation Bréguet 891R Mars, it retained the swing tail but had provision for 20 paratroopers and was powered by two  Gnome-Rhône 14R-200 radial engines. The Mars had parachute doors on each side of the fuselage, a floor chute for dropping containers and also a towing hook for a glider.

The third variant and the first to fly on 1 March 1949 was a convertible passenger/cargo aircraft, designated the Bréguet 892S Mercure. Although based on the 890H the 892S had four  Renault 12S inline piston engines. It had a large cargo door on the starboard side and two passenger doors in the port side. When fitted with seats it could carry 40 passengers.

Only one prototype of each variant was built, the French Air Force ordered the Nord Noratlas rather than the Mars and with the availability of war-surplus aircraft like the Douglas DC-3 available to commercial operators the type did not enter production.

Variants
890H Mercure
Twin-engined freighter/commercial transport prototype powered by two  Bristol Hercules radial engines, one built, first flown in April 1950. Later the 892S variant was modified to the 890H standard.
890J Mercure
Prototype commercial transport was originally to be powered by two Jumo 211 but with the availability of the British Hercules engine the designation was changed to 890H.
891R Mars
Twin-engined military freighter variant of the 890H powered by two  Gnome-Rhône 14R-200 radial engines, one built, first flown in November 1949.
892S Mercure
Four-engined convertible cargo/passenger variant with four  Renault 12S inline piston engines, one built, first flown in March 1949. The 892S was later converted to be the second 890H.
893S
Unbuilt variant that would have used Bristol Hercules engines.
894
Unbuilt variant that would have used Pratt & Whitney R-2800 engines.
895H
A larger variant was proposed in 1953 but not built.

Specifications 892S Mercure

References

Notes

Bibliography

1940s French military utility aircraft
 0890
Four-engined tractor aircraft
Aircraft first flown in 1949
Four-engined piston aircraft
High-wing aircraft